Joaquina Costa Iglesias (born March 24, 1967 in Pontevedra) is a Spanish sprint canoer who competed in the early 1990s. At the 1992 Summer Olympics in Barcelona, she finished ninth the K-2 500 m event while being eliminated in the semifinals of the K-4 500 m event.

References
 Sports-Reference.com profile

1967 births
Canoeists at the 1992 Summer Olympics
Living people
Olympic canoeists of Spain
Spanish female canoeists